PopCo is a 2004 novel by British author Scarlett Thomas. The book addresses several mathematical topics.

Plot

It tells a story of twenty-nine-year-old Alice Butler, a quirky, fiercely intelligent loner with an affinity for secret codes and mathematics. She works for the huge toy company named PopCo, where she creates snooping kids' kits - KidSpy, KidTec and KidCracker. At the company conference Alice and her colleagues are brought into developing the ultimate product for the teenage girls.

Reception

The novel has been compared to Cryptonomicon by Neal Stephenson, with similarities including a buried treasure subplot and flashbacks to Bletchley Park.

A review in the journal of the American Mathematical Society praised its "subversive and lively style". A review in The Independent praised "the weight of ideas and downright chutzpah crammed into this book." Another review in The Independent described it as "a big, zeitgeisty novel that free-associates in the way that only cyberpunk science-fiction used to be able to do. It is such enormous fun, and so peppered with sharp observations and satirical jabs, that it gets away with editorialising patches [and] a certain hastiness of composition". A review in The Guardian described it as "awkward" but ultimately enjoyable.

However, another review in The Guardian found it "clumsy", writing "Thomas cannot decide whether she is writing a boarding-school adventure or a dystopic tale of global corporations." A review in the Daily Telegraph wrote "its adolescent earnestness and its morally fibrous manifesto can make for queasy reading."

PopCo was a 2004 book of the year in Time Out and The Independent on Sunday.

References

2004 British novels
Novels about cryptography
Postmodern novels
HarperCollins books